Annika Uvehall (born 5 March 1965) is a former Swedish backstroke swimmer. She competed in the 1980 Summer Olympics where she swum the 100 m backstroke and the 4×100 m medley relay.

Clubs
Sandviks IK

References

1965 births
Living people
Swimmers at the 1980 Summer Olympics
Olympic swimmers of Sweden
Swedish female backstroke swimmers
20th-century Swedish women